Sam Fowler and Amanda Cory are fictional characters from the American soap opera Another World. Sam was played by Robert Kelker-Kelly, Danny Markel, and Brian Lane Green. Amanda was played by Sandra Ferguson, Christine Tucci, and Laura Moss. The couple were a popular super couple for fans during the late 1980s and early 1990s.

Their love affair lasted from 1987, shortly after their first meeting, until 1990. They remarried in 1991 and the second try lasted until early 1993 when it ended in divorce.

History
Amanda Cory is the only biological child of wealthy publisher Mac (Douglass Watson) and Rachel Cory (Victoria Wyndham). She had a rocky childhood with her parents constantly splitting up, among other events. She still led a life of privilege and enjoyed a close bond with her family.

In 1987, Amanda returned to Bay City from Paris, where she was attending school. At the same time, a man named Sam Fowler came to town. He was there to find his half-brother, Mitch Blake (William Gray Espy), who was also the biological father of Amanda's brother, Matthew. Sam was a budding artist and needed a place to stay.

When Amanda returned to town, she was informed by her brother that their parents were throwing a cotillion for her. She was angry as she did not want to have people perceive her as spoiled, rich, or glamorous. When Amanda told Rachel that she didn't want the party (mere hours before it was to be held), Rachel was crushed because all she wanted was to give Amanda the perks that she was denied when she grew up poor. Rachel's mother Ada (Constance Ford) understood Rachel's sadness but she implored her to understand her daughter's right to have a say on events that impacted her life. Amanda did not want to hurt her mother, however, and showed up at the cotillion on time, in full debutante regalia. Mitch had the idea to have Sam work as a valet at Amanda's party to earn some money. Mitch had to promise his fiancée Felicia Gallant (Linda Dano) that Mac was not to know that Sam was related to him, due to previous issues between the Cory family and him.

When Amanda first showed up at the Cory mansion, Sam mistook Amanda for another valet, and was fairly bossy toward her. Amanda just wanted to be treated like any other person, so she did not tell him who her parents were, and since he did not see her at the debutante ball, he remained blissfully unaware. She made up this persona called "Mandy Ashton" and started working on Brava Magazine at Cory Publishing, her father's company. She made her father promise not to tell anyone who she was, and that he could only talk about it to people who knew (such as her mother, and her best friend Julie Ann). He agreed, under the guise that she did not want to be treated differently due to who her parents were. Mac also hired Sam as a cover art designer, with Felicia pulling some strings with Rachel to get him the job. "Mandy" buddied up to Sam and eventually started working as his assistant. Over time, they fell in love. Sam's friend Joyce came to break them up but was unsuccessful.

Eventually, however, Sam found out, fired "Mandy", and became very resentful toward Amanda; this stemmed from Sam's long animosity against anyone who had money. After Amanda pleaded with him that she was still the same person he fell in love with, he took her back. Amanda lost her virginity to Sam and later found out that she was pregnant with his child. At first she did not tell him, as she found out when they were estranged, but she eventually told him the truth when they reconciled. While he had mixed feelings, he realized that he was going to love this baby with all of his heart.

Mac Cory, who did not know that Sam was related to Mitch, was finally let in on the information. Liz Matthews (Irene Dailey), who had come back to town and resumed secretarial duties for Mac, found Sam's file and told Mac that his next of kin was Mitch and that they were brothers. Mac saw red and wanted to fire Sam, and was very disillusioned that his wife would also lie about the situation (she had been sworn to secrecy by Felicia, and understood that she would be more accepting of Sam than Mac would). After a while, however, Mac's emotions cooled and he grew to accept Sam, or as much as Mac knew how. With everyone in the know, Sam and Amanda got engaged and planned a wedding.

Sam and Mitch's mother Loretta (Rosemary Murphy) came to town, and her big secret was revealed fairly early: she was a kleptomaniac. When Loretta stole a wedding present to give to Amanda, Sam confronted her on his wedding day and ordered her to take it back. When Loretta denied that she ever stole anything, Sam yelled at her and said he was fed up with having such a horrible mother. Shocked, Loretta slapped him and walked out. Sam took matters into his own hands and went to Chicago, where his mother stole the present, with the intent of returning it. When he got there, however, he was accused of thieving the item. Sam, pushed over the edge, punched the security guard and was arrested. Amanda did not know what was going on and waited for Sam at the chapel. She was heartbroken when he didn't show up, but believed, deep down in her heart, that he would not do this to her without a good reason. Mac told everyone that he knew that Sam would break her heart the whole time, because he was related to Mitch. Squabbling ensued, with Ada finally ordering everyone to be quiet. Loretta admitted that they had a fight, and told the Corys what it involved.

Sam was freed from the jail and raced back to town, only to find that he was too late. He drove up to the Cory mansion and spied on the squabbling guests, finally deciding on climbing up to Amanda's window. She started to yell at him for missing their important day, but as soon as he explained, Amanda hugged him and knew their love was real. They decided to go back to the church and the two held a late-night wedding.

They wed shortly before Amanda gave birth to her only child, Alexandra "Alli" Fowler (named after Mac's mother). Amanda, who was always very close to her father, was devastated when he died of a heart attack. Their marriage fell apart when Sam found out she was sleeping with Evan Frame (Charles Grant), but the two got back together again for a short time, until Sam left Amanda to focus on his music career.

Amanda began writing a biography on Senator Grant Harrison (Mark Pinter), and after his marriage to Vicky Hudson (Jensen Buchanan) fell apart, the two of them began a romantic relationship. Then Evan Frame came back to town. He tried to start up a relationship, but Amanda wasn't interested in cheating on her fiance. When Amanda and Evan were in a car accident together, Grant assumed she'd been unfaithful, but married her while she was still recovering. She spent months in a wheelchair with Grant calling all the shots, but as soon as she could walk again and realized what a skunk her husband was, she divorced him. When his mother showed up in town pretending to be Rachel, Amanda left, feeling like her mother didn't want her around.

Amanda returned a few months later, determined to break her mother and Carl up. She pretended to be a woman named "Hadley Prescott", who was having an affair with Amanda. Eventually she was found out, but not before developing feelings for IAD officer Neil Johansen, co-owner of the Herald Jake McKinnon (Matt had given Amanda his half), and carpenter-turned-doctor Shane Roberts. After Carl was presumed dead, Amanda put her anger with Carl behind her to support her mother.

Amanda began a romantic relationship with Frank Cameron, a convict-turned-FBI-agent who was sent to infiltrate the Cory household. Despite misgivings about his past, Amanda fell in love with Cameron, who she discovered was really Cameron Sinclair, and the two began to plan their future together, until Amanda discovered that while she and Gary were fighting for their lives, Cameron and Josie were making love on the beach. She was able to forgive him for the affair, and the two began planning for their wedding. On the day of the ceremony, Amanda learned that Josie was pregnant with Cameron's baby, and he'd been lying to her all along. She called off the ceremony, then spent a time being stalked by Jordan Stark, who knew that Amanda was the reincarnation of his dead wife, Amalie Kittridge. Cameron was instrumental in saving her, and the two ended up getting married after all.

Television characters introduced in 1978
Television characters introduced in 1987
Fowler